A pool-building game is a game where the players build a pool of items (e.g. cards or dice) throughout the game. Some or all of the items in their pool have a resource which allows other items to be purchased, from a set of items that are not in the players pool. These games have frequent recycling methods to allow the purchased items to be drawn and played later in the game.

Pool item types 
While there are several different types of items used in the pool, like dice or chips, the pool building genre started with Dominion, where players purchase cards from a common area and they get reshuffled into their decks. When the pool item is a card, the type of game is called a deck-building game.

Examples 
 Deck-building: Dominion
 Bag-building: The Quacks of Quedlinburg
 Dice-building: Quarriors!

References

Construction and management simulation games